The Lena Road School is located in Pound, Wisconsin. It was added to the National Register of Historic Places in 2002.

History
The school taught grades 1 through 8 before it was consolidated in 1964. Afterwards, the building was bought by the Maedke family who then restored it.

References

School buildings on the National Register of Historic Places in Wisconsin
Defunct schools in Wisconsin
Schools in Marinette County, Wisconsin
School buildings completed in 1911
National Register of Historic Places in Marinette County, Wisconsin
1911 establishments in Wisconsin